Norman North High School is a public, co-educational secondary school in Norman, Oklahoma. It was established on August 21, 1997, on the grounds of what had been Longfellow Middle School since 1972. Longfellow Has now been relocated to the building that once was Central Mid-High.

Notable alumni
 Mauro Cichero, professional soccer player, currently playing for the Charleston Battery
Jordan Evans, currently plays for the Cincinnati Bengals
 Ray William Johnson- YouTube Comedian/Personality
 Owen Joyner, actor
Charlie Kolar, NFL football player for the Baltimore Ravens
 Trae Young, currently plays for the Atlanta Hawks, former First-Team All-American, 2017-18 NCAA scoring and assists leader

References

External links
Norman North Home Page

Public high schools in Oklahoma
Educational institutions established in 1997
Buildings and structures in Norman, Oklahoma
Schools in Cleveland County, Oklahoma
1997 establishments in Oklahoma